Glenn Cannon (November 21, 1932 – April 20, 2013) was an American actor and educator best known for his roles on Hawaii Five-O and Magnum, P.I. He also appeared on Lost in a pair of different roles.

Cannon's career began back to the 1950s with roles in shows like Alfred Hitchcock Presents, The Outer Limits and Combat!. On Magnum, P.I., Cannon was featured as Dr. Ibold, while on Hawaii Five-O, he played Attorney General John Manicote. In the mid-1960s he taught elementary school in Los Angeles at Lanai Road School in Encino, California.

In recent years, he served as president of the Hawaii chapter of the Screen Actors Guild and its successor group, SAG-AFTRA.

Cannon was a Professor of Theatre at the University of Hawaii at Manoa and also co-director of the UH-Manoa Cinematic and Digital Arts program.

Partial filmography
Cop Hater (1958) - Gang Leader - Rip
Mad Dog Coll (1961) - Harry
Hawaii Five-O (1970-1977, TV Series) - Manicote / Carlson/Col. Franklin/Stone
Magnum, P.I. (1981-1988, TV Series) - Dr. Ibold/Dr. Bernard Kessler
Picture Bride (1994) - Mer. Pieper

References

External links

American male film actors
American male television actors
Male actors from Hawaii
1932 births
2013 deaths
University of Hawaiʻi faculty
20th-century American male actors